Michael Lewis Cunningham (born 5 February 1991) is an English footballer who plays as a forward for Flower City Union in the National Independent Soccer Association.

Career

Youth
Cunningham played with various local sides before attending the Nike Academy, where he impressed enough to earn an academy contract at Luton Town in 2010.

College & Semi Professional
Following his release from Luton Town, Cunningham applied to various college's in the United States, eventually been offered a scholarship to play college soccer at NCAA Division II college Roberts Wesleyan College in New York. At Roberts Wesleyan, Cunningham made 76 appearances, scoring 30 goals and tallying 17 assists over four seasons and was twice named First Team All-American, in 2012 and 2014.

In the summer of 2014, Cunningham also appeared for USL Premier Development League side Southern California Seahorses.

Professional
Cunningham signed his first professional contract In January 2016 with Australian NPL Victoria 2 side Northcote City FC. He went on to make 11 appearances for the club.

Following a spell in Australia, Cunningham has a short stint with Midland Premier League side Quorn in the second half of 2016.

Cunningham returned to the United States in 2017, joining MASL indoor soccer side Syracruse Silver Knights and later Rochester Lancers. With Rochester in 2018, Cunningham scored 13 goals in 13 appearances. He made a single appearance for the indoor team in 2019, and scored 7 in 17 appearances in 2020. Rochester also operate an outdoor team who compete in the NPSL, who Cunningham played with in 2019, scoring 4 goals in 10 regular season appearances. The 2020 season was cancelled due to the COVID-19 pandemic.

On 7 April 2021, Cunningham joined USL Championship side FC Tulsa following a successful trial. He made his debut for the club on 19 May 2021, appearing as a 74th-minute substitute during a 5–0 loss to Atlanta United 2.

On 20 September 2021, Cunningham joined National Independent Soccer Association club Stumptown AC on a loan deal.

Personal
As well as playing professionally, Cunningham also operates a YouTube channel and podcast under his 7mlc brand, which has  more than one million subscribers.

References

External links
 
 MASL profile

1991 births
Association football forwards
English expatriate footballers
English expatriate sportspeople in Australia
English expatriate sportspeople in the United States
English footballers
Expatriate soccer players in Australia
Expatriate soccer players in the United States
FC Tulsa players
Footballers from Nottingham
Living people
Luton Town F.C. players
Major Arena Soccer League players
National Premier Soccer League players
Nike Academy players
Northcote City FC players
Quorn F.C. players
Southern California Seahorses players
USL Championship players
USL League Two players
College men's soccer players in the United States
Roberts Wesleyan University alumni
Stumptown AC players
National Independent Soccer Association players
Harrisburg Heat (MASL) players